John Latham may refer to:

 John Latham (ornithologist) (1740–1837), British physician, naturalist and author
 John Latham (1761–1843), English physician, President of the Royal College of Physicians
 John Latham (1787–1853), his son, English magistrate  and poet
 John Latham (judge) (1877–1964), Australian judge and politician
 John Cridland Latham (1888–1975), U.S. Army soldier and Medal of Honor recipient
 John Latham (artist) (1921–2006), conceptual artist born in Zambia
 John Latham (Whitewater), U.S. bank executive involved in Whitewater controversy, 1990s
 Jack Latham (1914–1987), U.S. actor
 John Latham (physicist) (1937–2021), British physicist